Babis Papadimitriou (born 1954) is a Greek journalist, news analyst, economist and commentator at Skai TV and Skai 100.3 radio station. He was elected a Greek MP at the last elections of 2019 with New Democracy. He is a lead economic and political analyst at Skai TV, a Greek broadcast channel. He is also a famous columnist at Kathimerini newspaper.

Life
Papadimitriou was born in Athens in 1954. After graduating from the Fifth Gymnasium of Exarchia he studied economics in Paris, where he earned a degree in economics (Paris X - Nanterre, 1979) and then took post-graduate specialization (Masters) in "Money and Finance" (Paris X - Nanterre, 1981) and a second Master's degree in Economic History (Ecole des Hautes Etudes et Sciences Sociales). As an economist, he has worked with the Ministry of Finance (Greece) and with many banks such as the Bank of Greece, Emporiki Bank and Eurobank EFG. Papadimitriou has 2 daughters. 

Babis Papadimitriou has become recently popular for his daily media commentary about the Greek debt crisis.

References

1954 births
Greek television journalists
Living people
Greek MPs 2019–2023
New Democracy (Greece) politicians
Politicians from Athens
Journalists from Athens